Josiomorphoides gigantea is a moth of the subfamily Arctiinae first described by Herbert Druce in 1897. It is found in Panama and Colombia.

References

Moths described in 1897
Arctiinae